The English Spot is a breed of domestic rabbit that was developed in England in the 19th century through selective breeding. Averaging 5 to 8 pounds in weight, the English Spot is a medium-sized breed that is most noted by the distinctive colored markings on its body, including the butterfly nose marking, eye circles, cheek spots, herringbone, colored ears, and a chain of spots. The English Spot's fur type is flyback. The breed comes in seven different varieties, including black, blue, chocolate, lilac, tortoise, gray, and gold . English Spots have a full arch body, with long front legs that carry them off the table. English Spots are most known for their curious and fun loving nature.

History
The English Spot is believed to be one of the oldest breeds of fancy rabbit. The exact origin of the English Spot is not known, but is thought to have come from the English Butterfly. It is thought to be a relative of the Checkered Giant due to their shared physical features, such as cheek spots, butterflies, eye circles, colored ears, and a herringbone. The Checkered Giant is a larger breed, weighing on average 10-14 pounds.

The breed has been common in England since the 1850s, and was imported to North America at around 1910. The American English Spot Rabbit Club was established in 1924. The French named the breed "Lapin Papillon Anglais", or the English Butterfly Rabbit from the butterfly marking on the nose. Previous generations of the breed entailed a white rabbit with patches of color and through the years has acquired clearly defined markings.

Description

The English Spot is a medium-sized breed, averaging 5-8 pounds. They are known for their arched body type, with two front paws that lift them off the table showing daylight under the belly. The hips should be well rounded and slightly broader than the shoulders. The legs are long and slender; the hind legs are parallel with the body. The ears are to be vertical.  An English Spot that is well marked "will not show off the markings without the correct body type."

An English Spot is known by its six types of body markings: butterfly, cheek spots, eye circles, colored ears, herringbone, and chain of spots. The butterfly is a butterfly marking around the nose; if looking straight at the rabbit's nose, the butterfly will peak in the middle and have a wing on both sides. The cheek spots are colored dots below the eye on both sides of the rabbit. Eye circles are solid colored circles around both eyes of the rabbit. The herringbone is a straight, solid line that runs from the base of the ears to the tip of the tail along the rabbit's backbone. The most known feature of the English Spot is the chain of individual spots that sweeps both sides of the rabbit's body, running from the base of the neck to the hind legs.

Lifestyle
The English Spot is an active rabbit needing an hour or two to run around each day. They are most active in the morning and night and sleep during the day. Due to its arched body type, the English Spot is judged while it runs the length of a table, which allows the animals body type to be fully assessed.

With an active lifestyle, comes a hearty appetite. Like the majority of rabbits, the most important component of the diet of an English Spot rabbit is hay, a roughage that reduces the chance of blockages and malocclusion whilst providing indigestible fiber necessary to keep the gut moving. Grass hays such as Timothy are generally preferred over legume hays like clover and alfalfa. Legume hays are higher in protein, calories, and calcium, which in excess can cause kidney stones and loose stool. This type of hay should be reserved for young kits or lactating does.

Some of the vegetables that rabbits enjoy are leafy greens such as green leaf lettuce and kale as well as parsley, thyme, cilantro, dandelion, and basil. The green, leafy tops of radishes and carrots also are excellent sources of nutrients—more than the vegetable itself. New vegetables should be introduced slowly due to the delicate digestive systems of rabbits. Foods such as cauliflower, broccoli, and cabbage can cause gas and can lead to a serious condition called gastrointestinal stasis, so they need to be given in small quantities at the start to see how they are tolerated. Vegetables such as potatoes and corn should also avoided due to their high starch content. All breeds of rabbits also require an unlimited amount of fresh water, usually provided for in a water crock, tip-proof ceramic pet dish, or hanging water bottle.

Breeding
The English Spot doe, female, will foster young easily, often raising her young with the litter of other breeds. A normal litter is on average, 5-7 young with a gestation period of 30–32 days. Of a litter from two marked rabbits, 25% will be a solid color (AKA Sports), 25% will have partial markings (AKA Charlies), and 50% will have all the required markings of an English Spot. This is a result of the En, en gene that rabbits have. Solids (Sports in English Spots) will have enen genes, brokens (Marked in English Spots) will have Enen, and Charlies carry EnEn. As a result of this, if you breed a Charlie and a Sport you will get 100% Marked kits. It is not advised to breed a Charlie to a broken but if you do you will get 50% Charlie and 50% Marked. Similar result will happen with Sports and Marked, 50% sports and 50% Marked. will keep Sports and Charlies if their type (Body shape) is desirable.

A pregnant English Spot will require adequate food to support her and her young. Four weeks into the pregnancy, it is common for breeders to provide the doe with a nest box filled with straw. The doe will burrow in the straw and begin lining the nest with hair she pulls from her stomach, in order to insulate her litter and keep them warm, and when ready, she will have her young in the nest. When the kits are 8 weeks of age, it is advised for the young to be separated from their mother.

See also

List of rabbit breeds

Citations

External links

Information
Spotted Beauty - Geocities
4Ever Friends Rabbitry
English Rabbit Breed Profile - PetPlanet
WE.B.C.N.SPOTS RABBITRY
On The Brightside Rabbitry
English rabbit information site (UK)
English Spot Rabbit Breed History
Breeds of Rabbits

Organizations
National English Rabbit Club
The American English Spot Rabbit Club (AESRC)
The American Rabbit Breeders Association (ARBA)

Rabbit breeds
Rabbits as pets
Rabbit breeds originating in England